Modisimus is a genus of cellar spiders that was first described by Eugène Louis Simon in 1893.

Species
 it contains eighty-three species and one subspecies, found in Central America, Europe, Asia, North America, the Caribbean, South America, Australia, on the Seychelles, and the Pacific Islands:
M. angulatus Huber & Fischer, 2010 – Hispaniola
M. bachata Huber & Fischer, 2010 – Hispaniola
M. beneficus Gertsch, 1973 – Mexico
M. berac Huber, 2010 – Hispaniola
M. boneti Gertsch, 1971 – Mexico
M. bribri Huber, 1998 – Costa Rica, Panama
M. cahuita Huber, 1998 – Costa Rica
M. caldera Huber, 1998 – Panama
M. cavaticus Petrunkevitch, 1929 – Puerto Rico
M. chiapa Gertsch, 1977 – Mexico
M. chickeringi Gertsch, 1973 – Panama
M. cienaga Huber & Fischer, 2010 – Hispaniola
M. coco Huber, 1998 – Costa Rica
M. coeruleolineatus Petrunkevitch, 1929 – Puerto Rico
M. concolor Bryant, 1940 – Cuba
M. cornutus Kraus, 1955 – Honduras
M. coxanus (Bryant, 1940) – Cuba
M. cuadro Huber & Fischer, 2010 – Hispaniola
M. culicinus (Simon, 1893) – South America. Introduced to Germany, Czech Rep., Zaire, Seychelles, Sri Lanka, Indonesia, China, Australia, Pacific Is.
M. david Huber, 1997 – Nicaragua, Panama
M. deltoroi Valdez-Mondragón & Francke, 2009 – Mexico
M. dilutus Gertsch, 1941 – Panama
M. dominical Huber, 1998 – Costa Rica
M. elevatus Bryant, 1940 – Cuba
M. elongatus Bryant, 1940 – Cuba
M. enriquillo Huber & Fischer, 2010 – Hispaniola
M. epepye Huber, 2010 – Hispaniola
M. femoratus Bryant, 1948 – Hispaniola
M. fuscus Bryant, 1948 – Hispaniola
M. glaucus Simon, 1893 (type) – Hispaniola, St. Vincent
M. globosus Schmidt, 1956 – Colombia
M. gracilipes Gertsch, 1973 – Guatemala
M. guatuso Huber, 1998 – Nicaragua to Panama
M. guerrerensis Gertsch & Davis, 1937 – Mexico
M. incertus (Bryant, 1940) – Cuba
M. inornatus O. Pickard-Cambridge, 1895 – Mexico
M. iviei Gertsch, 1973 – Mexico
M. ixobel Huber, 1998 – Guatemala
M. jima Huber & Fischer, 2010 – Hispaniola
M. kiskeya Huber & Fischer, 2010 – Hispaniola
M. leprete Huber, 2010 – Hispaniola
M. macaya Huber & Fischer, 2010 – Hispaniola
M. maculatipes O. Pickard-Cambridge, 1895 – Mexico
M. madreselva Huber, 1998 – Costa Rica
M. makandal Huber & Fischer, 2010 – Hispaniola
M. mango Huber, 2010 – Hispaniola
M. mariposas Huber & Fischer, 2010 – Hispaniola
M. mckenziei Gertsch, 1971 – Mexico
M. minima (González-Sponga, 2009) – Venezuela
M. miri Huber & Fischer, 2010 – Hispaniola
M. mitchelli Gertsch, 1971 – Mexico
M. modicus (Gertsch & Peck, 1992) – Ecuador (Galapagos Is.)
M. montanus Petrunkevitch, 1929 – Puerto Rico
Modisimus m. dentatus Petrunkevitch, 1929 – Puerto Rico
M. nicaraguensis Huber, 1998 – Nicaragua
M. ovatus Bryant, 1940 – Cuba
M. palenque Gertsch, 1977 – Mexico
M. palvet Huber & Fischer, 2010 – Hispaniola
M. pana Huber, 1998 – Guatemala
M. paraiso Huber, 2010 – Hispaniola
M. pavidus Bryant, 1940 – Cuba
M. pelejil Huber & Fischer, 2010 – Hispaniola
M. pittier Huber, 1998 – Costa Rica, Panama
M. propinquus O. Pickard-Cambridge, 1896 – Mexico
M. pulchellus Banks, 1929 – Panama
M. pusillus Gertsch, 1971 – Mexico
M. rainesi Gertsch, 1971 – Mexico
M. reddelli Gertsch, 1971 – Mexico
M. roumaini Huber, 2010 – Hispaniola
M. sanpedro Jiménez & Palacios-Cardiel, 2015 – Mexico
M. sanvito Huber, 1998 – Costa Rica
M. sarapiqui Huber, 1998 – Costa Rica
M. seguin Huber & Fischer, 2010 – Hispaniola
M. selvanegra Huber, 1998 – Nicaragua
M. sexoculatus Petrunkevitch, 1929 – Puerto Rico
M. signatus (Banks, 1914) – Puerto Rico
M. simoni Huber, 1997 – Venezuela
M. solus Gertsch & Peck, 1992 – Ecuador (Galapagos Is.)
M. texanus Banks, 1906 – USA, Mexico
M. tiburon Huber & Fischer, 2010 – Hispaniola
M. toma Huber & Fischer, 2010 – Hispaniola
M. tortuguero Huber, 1998 – Costa Rica
M. tzotzile Brignoli, 1974 – Mexico
M. vittatus Bryant, 1948 – Hispaniola

See also
 List of Pholcidae species

References

Araneomorphae genera
Pantropical spiders
Pholcidae
Spiders of North America
Spiders of South America